Mount Bresnahan is a flat-topped, mainly ice-free mountain,  high, situated along the east side of the Helliwell Hills,  north-northeast of Mount Van der Hoeven, situated in Victoria Land, Antarctica. The topographical feature was first mapped by the United States Geological Survey from surveys and from U.S. Navy air photos, 1960–63, and named by the Advisory Committee on Antarctic Names after David M. Bresnahan, a United States Antarctic Research Program biologist at McMurdo Station, Hut Point Peninsula, Ross Island, 1967–68 and 1968–69, and on the staff of the Office of Polar Programs, National Science Foundation, from 1970. The mountain lies situated on the Pennell Coast, a portion of Antarctica lying between Cape Williams and Cape Adare.

References 

Mountains of Victoria Land
Pennell Coast